Jaida Dreyer is an American-Canadian country music singer and songwriter. She was signed as the flagship artist on Streamsound Records, a label founded in 2012 by Byron Gallimore.

Biography
Dreyer debuted in 2012 with the singles "Guy's Girl" and "Confessions", both of which charted on Hot Country Songs. She also wrote "Home Alone Tonight" was recorded by country music artist Luke Bryan as a duet with Karen Fairchild of Little Big Town for his fifth studio album, Kill the Lights (2015). The song was performed on the American Music Awards and followed with a multi-week number 1 single.

In early 2013, Deyer released her third single, "Half Broke Horses". Dreyer's debut album, I Am Jaida Dreyer, was released on February 26, 2013. Dreyer wrote nine songs for the ABC's television musical drama, Nashville. "Dreams" was performed by Hayden Panettiere's character Julliette Barnes and "This Town" performed by Clare Bowen's character Scarlett O'Connor.

She competed as a contestant on the USA Network's Real Country show in 2018, and was crowned the winner of its inaugural season.

Discography

Albums

Singles

Music videos

Awards and nominations

References

Canadian women country singers
Canadian country singer-songwriters
Musicians from Thunder Bay
Streamsound Records artists
Living people
21st-century Canadian women singers
Year of birth missing (living people)